Oreophryne monticola is a species of frog in the family Microhylidae.
It is endemic to Indonesia.
Its natural habitat is subtropical or tropical moist montane forests.
It is threatened by habitat loss.

References

monticola
Amphibians of Indonesia
Taxonomy articles created by Polbot
Amphibians described in 1897